The 2015–16 Alpe Adria Cup, also known as Sixt Alpe Adria Cup by sponsorship reasons, was the first edition of this tournament. It started on 29 September 2015 and finished in March 2016.

Eight teams joined the competition and were divided into two groups of four teams each one. The eight teams advanced to a playoff where the four winners qualified to the Final Four.

Regular season

Group A

Group B

Quarterfinals
First games of the quarterfinals will be played from 3 February 2016, at the arena of the Team #2.

|}

Final four
The four winners of the quarterfinals joined the Final Four that was played on 1 and 2 March 2016 in Domžale, Slovenia. Helios Suns Domžale, host team, achieved the title of the first edition of the Alpe Adria Cup.

References

External links
Official website
Alpe Adria Cup at Eurobasket.com

2015-16
2015–16 in European basketball leagues
2015–16 in Croatian basketball
2015–16 in Slovenian basketball
2015–16 in Slovak basketball
2015–16 in Austrian basketball